Neothyris is a genus of brachiopods belonging to the family Terebratellidae.

The species of this genus are found mostly in New Zealand.

Species:

Neothyris lenticularis 
Neothyris ovalis 
Neothyris rylandae 
Neothyris westpacifica

References

Brachiopod genera
Terebratulida